Diaea is a genus of crab spiders first described by Tamerlan Thorell in 1869. Most species are found in specific locations except for D. livens, which occurs in the United States and D. dorsata, which has a palearctic distribution.

Species
 it contains forty-six species:

References

Thomisidae
Thomisidae genera
Cosmopolitan spiders
Taxa named by Tamerlan Thorell